Kerri-Ann Mitchell (born March 29, 1983 in Toronto) is a Canadian sprinter.  She competed in the 100 metres competition at the 2012 Summer Olympics; she ran Round 1 in 11.49 seconds, which did not qualify her for the semifinals.

References

1983 births
Living people
Canadian female sprinters
Olympic track and field athletes of Canada
Athletes (track and field) at the 2012 Summer Olympics
Pan American Games track and field athletes for Canada
Athletes (track and field) at the 2011 Pan American Games
Athletes from Toronto
Arkansas Razorbacks women's track and field athletes
Black Canadian track and field athletes
Black Canadian sportswomen
Olympic female sprinters